The Minahassa pipistrelle (Pipistrellus minahassae) is a species of vesper bat found in Indonesia.

Sources

Pipistrellus
Mammals described in 1899
Taxa named by Christian Erich Hermann von Meyer
Bats of Indonesia
Endemic fauna of Indonesia
Mammals of Sulawesi
Taxonomy articles created by Polbot